Talin may refer to:

Places
Talin, Armenia, a city
Tálín, a municipality and village in the Czech Republic
Tallinn, capital of Estonia
Talin, Iran, a village in West Azerbaijan Province
Talin, Syria, a village in Tartus Governorate

Other
Talin (protein), the protein that connects integrin to the cytoskeleton
Thaumatin, a flavoring
Facundo Talín (born 1985), Argentine footballer

See also
Talen (disambiguation)
Talon (disambiguation)